The Ucennii, Ucenni or Iconii were a Gallic tribe dwelling in the Romanche valley, in the Alps, during the Iron Age.

Name 
They are mentioned as Ucenni (var. uceni, ucermi) by Pliny (1st c. AD) and on the Tropaeum Alpium, as Ucennos (var. ,) by Florus. The form  (Ἰκόνιοι) given by Strabo (early 1st c. AD) is most likely a variant of the ethnic name.

The meaning of the name remains obscure, although it is most likely of Celtic origin. It can be compared with the toponym Ucena in Galatia.

Geography 
The Ucenni lived in the Romanche valley, in the region of Oisans. Their territory was located south of the Graioceli, west of the Belaci, Segovii and Brigianii, north of the Tricorii, and west of the Vertamocorii and Allobroges.

Settlements are known at Catorissium (Le Bourg-d'Oisans), Mellosedum (Mont-de-Lans), and Durotincum (near La Grave and Villar-d'Arêne).

History 
They are mentioned by Pliny the Elder as one of the Alpine tribes conquered by Rome in 16–15 BC, and whose name was engraved on the Tropaeum Alpium.

References

Primary sources

Bibliography 

Historical Celtic peoples
Gauls
Tribes of pre-Roman Gaul